Şanver Göymen (born 22 January 1967 in Samsun) is a former Turkish football goalkeeper

Career

Club
His first football club was Samsunspor PAF. He became professional at Merizfonspor in 1990. He played for Denizlispor (1991–1993), Altay Izmir (1993–1998). Galatasaray SK wanted to transfer him, but he decided to stay by Altay.

He also played for Konyaspor (1998–1999), Çanakkale Dardanelspor (1999–2001) and Vestel Manisaspor in 2001.

International
He played for the Turkey national football team and was a participant at the 1996 UEFA European Championship.

Coaching
He retired in 2002. After his retirement, he made goalkeeper coach in Karşıyaka, Aydınspor, Altay and South African side Golden Arrows.

References

1967 births
Living people
Turkish footballers
Turkey international footballers
Association football goalkeepers
UEFA Euro 1996 players
Denizlispor footballers
Manisaspor footballers
Dardanelspor footballers
Altay S.K. footballers
Konyaspor footballers
Sportspeople from Samsun